Catalinimonas niigatensis is a  Gram-negative, strictly aerobic, rod-shaped and non-motile bacterium from the genus of Catalinimonas which has been isolated from sediments of a lake.

References

Cytophagia
Bacteria described in 2014